Mohammad Hossein Moradmand  (born 22 June 1993) is an Iranian professional footballer who plays as a center back for Persian Gulf Pro League club Esteghlal.

Club career

Sepahan
He joined Sepahan in the summer of 2012. From 2009 to 2012 he was a member of Sepahan under-21 football team.

Shahr Khodro(Padideh)
He joined Padideh (current Shahr Khodro) team in the season 2015–16 and scored in the first game for this team, which was accompanied by his 90-minute presence against Foolad.

Esteghlal
His brilliance in the Shahr Khodro team attracted the attention of Esteghlal Club, and finally Moradmand signed a contract with this team on September 11, 2016 and joined Esteghlal.

Malavan

He joined the Malavan on loan from Esteghlal to perform his military service.

Club career statistics

International career

U20
He was part of Iran U–20 during 2012 AFC U-19 Championship qualification, 2012 CIS Cup, 2012 AFF U-19 Youth Championship and 2012 AFC U-19 Championship.

U23
He invited to Iran U-23 training camp by Nelo Vingada to preparation for Incheon 2014 and 2016 AFC U-22 Championship (Summer Olympic qualification).

Honours
Sepahan
Iran Pro League (1): 2014–15
Hazfi Cup (1): 2012–13

Esteghlal
Hazfi Cup Runner-up (1): 2020–21
 Iranian Super Cup (1): 2022

References

1993 births
Living people
Sportspeople from Isfahan
Iranian footballers
Sepahan S.C. footballers
Esteghlal F.C. players
Malavan players
Iran under-20 international footballers
Association football central defenders